Marc Wagemakers (born 7 June 1978) is a Belgian football player.
 who plays for Standard Elen.

Career
He started his career as a little kid with a small provincial club but soon after a few years it was obvious that he was a good player and he transferred to the then second-tier club Patro Eisden and played there until 2001 when he transferred again, this time to top flight club K.V.C. Westerlo. As a defender he doesn't score many goals but he has scored in important games, he made winning goals against RSC Anderlecht and Racing Genk. For Westerlo, he played in the UEFA Cup in 2001–02 against German club Hertha BSC Berlin. At the end of the 2007–08 season his contract ended and he signed at Sint-Truiden, who had then just relegated from the Jupiler League.

References

1978 births
Belgian footballers
K. Patro Eisden Maasmechelen players
K.V.C. Westerlo players
Sint-Truidense V.V. players
Living people
Fortuna Sittard players
Belgian Pro League players
Eerste Divisie players
Belgian expatriate footballers
Belgian expatriate sportspeople in the Netherlands
Association football defenders
People from Maaseik
Footballers from Limburg (Belgium)